Federico Uribe (born 1962) is a Colombian artist living in Miami, Florida.

Biography

Federico Uribe is a Colombian artist born in 1962. At a young age he started showing his deep interest in art, on many occasions he has mentioned how he began painting with brushes when he was just a boy. At eighteen he decided to pursue a bachelor in arts at the University of Los Andes, where he graduated with honors. While studying he also decided to leave behind the brushes and started finding simple objects exciting and interesting in matters of Art. For that reason he started to collect different objects and left them aside until he had enough to construct a sculpture with them.  His art is hard to describe because it is a combination of abstract art and figurative that when completed turns into a magical creation. His inspiration comes from his compulsive temper and from literature specifically from words.

In 1988, Federico left Colombia and moved to New York where he would study a master in fine arts degree. Throughout those years he was guided by Luis Camnitzer, who taught him essential skills that Federico would later own use for his personal artworks. After years of studying and practicing, Federico has also lived in Cuba, Mexico, Russia, England and Miami where he is currently based.

The connection that Federico has with words has led his art to follow that certain word that comes up to his mind, and the process of creating art and the outcome would be extremely defined by it. And sometimes the association among the used objects and the meaning of the sculpture will end transmitting ironic, benevolent provocation.

His most recent work includes a series of animal sculptures created with bullets. The creatures are given certain features that of an animal that is on grief, threaten or escaping. This can be representations of the world and the current situations that we’re living in, where bullets are cheaper than buying a canvas and paint, where animals are massively being killed for fur, or food and the 90 percent of the killed animal's body mass is thrown away. Also every animal can portray a different person in the society such as the companies CEO's, who are represented by the lion that is at the top of the food chain. The running bunny who represent the people escaping from debt and duties.

Uribe grew up in Bogota, Colombia and attended the University of Los Andes. He continued to study painting in New York under the guidance of Luis Camnitzer. He has lived in Miami since 2000.

Uribe describes his early work as "painful paintings relating to religion." In 1996 he turned away from oil paint and "started playing with objects." He realized that is calling was not to draw or paint on canvas, but rather to mold objects into vibrants images.

Style and technique
Uribe finds opportunity and plasticity in bits and pieces that society associates with one particular task and repurposes them into beautiful works of art. He creates images that are assemblages of items such as colored shoe laces and pins, cut up pieces of color pencils, or electrical wires and components. His work is "constructed and woven in ways, curious and unpredictable, intricate and compulsive. Handcraft is essential to Uribe, who embraces a tradition of exquisitely made objects. 'I like the idea,' he says, 'of leaving my materials visible as a testimony of my process and how much work I put into it.'"

Uribe transmits his feelings inspired by books that he listens to or classical paintings that he recalls. Many of his pieces draw from Old Master paintings, such as Leonardo, Velazquez, and others; however, the artist chose not to make these references the focus of his message. The potential narratives or supposed meaning seen in his work are not meant to promote any particular ideology; rather, the artist wants the imagery of his experience to resonate with his viewers. According to Uribe, "If you relate to the objects, good. If it makes you smile, better. If it makes you think, I'm sure you're not thinking what I thought." Thus, the "plastic language" of his media, which transmits his emotional response to the world, hopes to relay a feeling – rather than a specific thought- to the viewer.

Selected solo exhibitions
2014 Adelson Galleries: New York, New York. Drawn in Pencils
2014 Adelson Galleries Boston: Boston, Massachusetts. Objects in a Mirror.
2013 Hudson River Museum: Yonkers, New York. Fantasy River.
2011 Boca Raton Museum of Art: Boca Raton, Florida. The World According to Federico Uribe.
2009 Chelsea Art Museum: New York, New York.
2007 Chelsea Art Museum: New York, New York.
2004 Art Museum of the Americas / O.A.S.: Washington, D.C.
2003 Bass Museum of Art: Miami, Florida.

References

 Exhibition catalog.

Further reading
 Exhibition review. 
 Exhibition review.

External links

1962 births
Living people
Colombian artists
American contemporary artists